Balacra haemalea is a moth of the family Erebidae. It was described by William Jacob Holland in 1893. It is found in Cameroon, the Republic of the Congo, the Democratic Republic of the Congo Equatorial Guinea and Gabon.

References

Balacra
Moths described in 1893
Insects of Cameroon
Insects of the Democratic Republic of the Congo
Fauna of the Republic of the Congo
Fauna of Gabon
Erebid moths of Africa